4 mm may refer to:

 4 mm caliber, gun cartridges between 4–5 mm diameter
 4 mm scale, in rail transport modelling,  1:76.2 scale with rails 16.5 mm apart, representing standard gauge in Britain